Michael Anthony Nock  (born 27 September 1940) is a New Zealand jazz pianist, currently based in Australia.

Biography
He was born in Christchurch, New Zealand. Nock began studying piano at 11.  He attended Nelson College for one term in 1955.  By the age of 18, he was performing in Australia. In Sydney he played in The Three Out trio with Freddy Logan and Chris Karan who toured England in 1961 before Nock left to attend Berklee College of Music. He was a member of Yusef Lateef's group from 1963 to 1965.

During 1968–1970, Nock was involved with fusion, leading the Fourth Way band. After a few years he became a studio musician in New York (1975–1985) and then returned to Australia.

His 1987 album Open Door with drummer Frank Gibson, Jr. was named that year's Best Jazz Album in the New Zealand Music Awards.

In the 2003 New Year Honours, Nock was appointed an Officer of the New Zealand Order of Merit, for services to jazz.
 
He currently lives in New South Wales where he taught at the Sydney Conservatorium of Music until 2018 and performs with his trio, big band, and various one-off ensembles.

Discography

Albums
{| class="wikitable plainrowheaders" style="text-align:center;" border="1"
|+ List of albums, with selected details
! Title
! Details
|-
! scope="row" | Between or Beyond  (as The Mike Nock Underground)
|
 Released: 1971
 Format: LP
 Label: MPS Records (MPS 15 261 ST)
|-
! scope="row" | Almanac  (with Bennie Maupin, Cecil McBee, Eddie Marshall)
|
 Released: 1977
 Format: LP
 Label: Improvising Artists
|-
! scope="row" | Magic Mansions
|
 Released: 1977
 Format: LP
 Label: Laurie Records (LES-6001)
|-
! scope="row" | In, Out and Around   (as Mike Nock Quartet)
|
 Released: 1978
 Format: LP
 Label: Timeless (SJP 119)
|-
! scope="row" | The Opal Heart  (David Liebman Quartet featuring Mike Nock)
|
 Released: 1978
 Format: LP
 Label: Enja (3065) 
|-
! scope="row" | Talisman / Solo
|
 Released: 1978
 Format: LP
 Label: Enja (3071)
|-
! scope="row" | Climbing
|
 Released: 1979
 Format: LP
 Label: Tomato (2696501)
|-
! scope="row" | Succubus
|
 Released: 1980
 Format: LP
 Label: Sutra Records (SUS 1005)
|-
! scope="row" | Piano Solos
|
 Released: 1980
 Format: LP
 Label: Timeless (SJP 134)
|-
! scope="row" | Ondas
|
 Released: 1981
 Format: LP
 Label: ECM Records (ECM 1220)
|-
! scope="row" | Strata
|
 Released: 1984
 Format: LP, Cassette
 Label: Kiwi  (SLC-179)
|-
! scope="row" | Strata
|
 Released: 1984
 Format: LP, Cassette
 Label: Kiwi  (SLC-179)
|-
! scope="row" | Open Door  (with Frank Gibson, Jr.)
|
 Released: 1986
 Format: LP, Cassette
 Label: Ode Records (SODET 260)
|-
! scope="row" | Beautiful Friendship  (as Mike Nock Too)
|
 Released: 1989
 Format: CD, LP, Cassette
 Label: Ode Recorde
|-
! scope="row" | Dark and Curious  (as Mike Nock Quartet)
|
 Released: 1990
 Format: CD, LP, Cassette
 Label: ABC Records (846873-2)
|-
! scope="row" | Touch
|
 Released: 1993
 Format: CD
 Label: Birdland (BL 001)
|-
! scope="row" | Temple  (with Cameron Undy)
|
 Released: 1996
 Format: CD
 Label: Dancing Laughing Records (DLR 001)
|-
! scope="row" | Not We But One  (as Mike Nock Trio)
|
 Released: 1997
 Format: CD
 Label: Naxos Jazz (86006-2)
|-
! scope="row" | Ozboppin'''  (as Mike Nock Quintet)
|
 Released: July 1998
 Format: CD
 Label: Naxos Jazz (86019-2)
|-
! scope="row" | The Waiting Game  (with Marty Ehrlich)
|
 Released: 2000
 Format: CD
 Label: Naxos Jazz (86048-2)
|-
! scope="row" | Everybody Wants to Go to Heaven  (as New York Jazz Collective with Marty Ehrlich, James Zollar, Ray Anderson, Mike Formanek & Pheeroan Aklaff)
|
 Released: 2001
 Format: CD
 Label: Naxos Jazz (86073-2)
|-
! scope="row" | Changing Seasons  (with Brett Hirst & Toby Hall)
|
 Released: 2002
 Format: CD
 Label: DIW (DIW-628)
|-
! scope="row" | Live  (as Mike Nock's Big Small Band)
|
 Released: 2003
 Format: CD
 Label: ABC Jazz (981567-6)
|-
! scope="row" | Duologue   (with Dave Liebman)
|
 Released: 2007
 Format: CD
 Label: Birdland Records (BL 009)
 note: Recorded live in 2004
|-
! scope="row" | Meeting of the Waters  (as The Mike Nock Project)
|
 Released: December 2007
 Format: CD 
 Label: Jazzhead (Head086)
|-
! scope="row" | Andrew Klippel Compositions 1980-1983  (as Mike Nock Trio)
|
 Released: 2008
 Format: CD (limited)
 Label: Andrew Klippel Productions (AKP0001)
|-
! scope="row" | An Accumulation of Subtleties  (as Mike Nock Trio)
|
 Released: 2010
 Format: 2×CD 
 Label: FWM Records (FWM001)
|-
! scope="row" | Transformations   (with Colin Hemmingsen & Nick Tipping)
|
 Released: 5 December 2011
 Format: Digital
 Label: Colin Hemmingsen
 Recorded in 2010
|-
! scope="row" | Hear and Know   (as Mike Nock Trio)
|
 Released: December 2011
 Format: CD, Digital
 Label: FWM Records (FWM002)
|-
! scope="row" | Sketches|
 Released: December 2011
 Format: CD, Digital
 Label: Ode Records (CDMANU5130)
|-
! scope="row" | Kindred   (with Laurence Pike)
|
 Released: 2012
 Format: CD, Digital
 Label: FWM Records (FWM003)
|-
! scope="row" | Opal Dream  (with Howie Smith)
|
 Released: 2012
 Format: CD, Digital
 Label: Open Blue (OBCD-1201)
|-
! scope="row" | Suite SIMA  (as Mike Nock Octet)
|
 Released: September 2014
 Format: CD, Digital
 Label: FWM Records (FWM004)
|-
! scope="row" | Two Out  (with Roger Manins)
|
 Released: May 2015
 Format: CD, Digital
 Label: FWM Records (FWM005)
|-
! scope="row" | The Monash Sessions  (with Tony Gould)
|
 Released: September 2015
 Format: CD, Digital
 Label: Jazzhead (HEAD218)
|-
! scope="row" | Beginning and End of Knowing  (with Laurence Pike)
|
 Released: October 2015
 Format: CD, LP, Digital
 Label: FWM Records (FWM006)
|-
! scope="row" | Vicissitudes   (as Mike Nock Trio with NZTrio)
|
 Released: 2016
 Format: CD, Digital
 Label: Rattle Records (RAT-D065)
|-
! scope="row" | This World  (with Hamish Stuart, Julien Wilson & Jonathan Zwartz)
|
 Released: October 2019
 Format: CD, Digital
 Label: Lionsharecords (LSR20196)
|-
! scope="row" | Another Dance  (with Hamish Stuart, Julien Wilson & Jonathan Zwartz)
|
 Released: January 2022
 Format: CD, Digital
 Label: Lionsharecords (LSR20212)
|}

Awards
AIR Awards
The Australian Independent Record Awards (commonly known informally as AIR Awards) is an annual awards night to recognize, promote and celebrate the success of Australia's Independent Music sector.

|-
|AIR Awards of 2012
|Hear and Now 
|Best Independent Jazz Album
|
|-
|AIR Awards of 2015
|Suite Sima 
|Best Independent Jazz Album
|
|-
|AIR Awards of 2020
|This World|Best Independent Jazz Album or EP
|
|-

ARIA Music Awards
The ARIA Music Awards are annual awards, which recognizes excellence, innovation, and achievement across all genres of Australian music.

! 
|-
|1992||Dark & Curious||Best Jazz Album|| ||rowspan="7"| 
|-
|1994||Touch||Best Jazz Album||
|-
|2000||The Waiting Game (with Marty Ehrlich)||Best Jazz Album||
|-
|2004||Big Small Band Live||Best Jazz Album||
|-
|2007||Duologue (with Dave Liebman)||Best Jazz Album||
|-
|2008||Meeting Of The Waters||Best Jazz Album||
|-
|2020||This World (with Hamish Stuart, Julien Wilson & Jonathan Zwartz)||Best Jazz Album||
|-
|2022||Another Dance (with Hamish Stuart, Julien Wilson & Jonathan Zwartz )||Best Jazz Album|||| 
|-

Australian Jazz Bell Awards
The Australian Jazz Bell Awards, (also known as the Bell Awards or The Bells), are annual music awards for the jazz music genre in Australia. They commenced in 2003.
(wins only)
|-
|2004
|Big Small Band Live – Mike Nock
|Best Australian Contemporary Jazz Album
|
|-
|2009
|Mike Nock
|Hall of Fame
|
|-
|2011
|An Accumulation of Subtleties – Mike Nock Trio
|Best Australian Contemporary Jazz Album
|
|-
|2015
|Suite Sima – Mike Nock Octet
|Best Australian Jazz Ensemble
|
|-
|2016
|Beginning and End of Knowing – Mike Nock & Laurence Pike
|Best Produced Album
|
|-

Don Banks Music Award
The Don Banks Music Award was established in 1984 to publicly honour a senior artist of high distinction who has made an outstanding and sustained contribution to music in Australia. It was founded by the Australia Council in honour of Don Banks, Australian composer, performer and the first chair of its music board.

|-
| 2014
| Mike Nock
| Don Banks Music Award
| 
|-

Mo Awards
The Australian Entertainment Mo Awards (commonly known informally as the Mo Awards), were annual Australian entertainment industry awards. They recognise achievements in live entertainment in Australia from 1975 to 2016.
 (wins only)
|-
| 1990
| Mike Nock Quartet
| Jazz Group of the Year
| 
|-

Music Victoria Awards
The Music Victoria Awards are an annual awards night celebrating Victorian music. They commenced in 2006.

! 
|-
| Music Victoria Awards of 2016
| Monash Sessions'' (with Tony Gould)
| Best Jazz Album
| 
|rowspan="1"| 
|-

References

External links
AudioCulture profile
[

1940 births
ARIA Award winners
Australian jazz pianists
New Zealand emigrants to Australia
Berklee College of Music alumni
DIW Records artists
ECM Records artists
Enja Records artists
Inner City Records artists
Jazz fusion pianists
Living people
MPS Records artists
New-age pianists
New Zealand jazz pianists
People educated at Nelson College
People from Christchurch
Post-bop pianists
Timeless Records artists
Officers of the New Zealand Order of Merit
21st-century pianists
Almanac (band) members
The Fourth Way (band) members
Improvising Artists Records artists